Dangerous Parking is a 2007 drama film written and directed by Peter Howitt based on the novel of the same name by Stuart Browne, who died in 1999.

Plot
Dangerous Parking tells the story of Noah Arkwright, a cult director in the indie film world, whose life is dominated by alcohol, drugs, and casual sex.

Alcoholism and drug addiction have him firmly in their grasp - but Noah has no interest in acknowledging either until Kirstin, a reformed alcoholic, convinces him that he is heading for destruction and sets him on the path to reclaim himself.

With the help of his best friend Ray and his new girlfriend Claire, Noah attempts to get his life back together. And that is when Mother Nature deals him the cruelest blow of all.

Main cast
 Peter Howitt as Noah Arkwright
 Saffron Burrows as Claire Matteson
 Sean Pertwee as Ray Molina
 Rachael Stirling as Kirstin
 Tom Conti as Doc Baker
 Alice Evans as Etta
 Victor McGuire as Harry
 Vincenzo Nicoli as Greek Fisherman

Production
Peter Howitt adapted the novel into a screenplay and directed the film, which he produced with Richard Johns.

Principal photography was completed on 16 November 2006; the film was completed in May 2007.

Awards
Tokyo International Film Festival (2007) - Best Director - Peter Howitt

References

External links
 
 Reviewgraveyard.com Review

2007 films
British drama films
2007 drama films
Films about alcoholism
Films based on British novels
Films directed by Peter Howitt
2000s English-language films
2000s British films